Tarbuck may refer to:

People 

 Raymond D. Tarbuck (1897–1986), rear admiral in the U.S. Navy
 Jimmy Tarbuck (born 1940), English comedian and TV personality
 Barbara Tarbuck (1942–2016), American actress
 Alan Tarbuck (born 1948), English footballer
 Liza Tarbuck (born 1964), English actress and TV presenter
 Bradley Tarbuck (born 1995), English footballer

Other uses 
 Tarbuck Crag, a mountain in Antarctica
 Tarbuck knot used by climbers